Deoxyschizandrin is a bio-active isolate of Schisandra chinensis.

Deoxyschizandrin has been found to act as an agonist of the adiponectin receptor 2 (AdipoR2).

References

Adiponectin receptor agonists
Phytochemicals